Setting Standards is an album led by trumpeter Woody Shaw which was recorded in 1983 and released on the Muse label. Setting Standards was released as part of Woody Shaw: The Complete Muse Sessions by Mosaic Records in 2013.

Reception

Scott Yanow of Allmusic stated, "This Muse release finds the brilliant trumpeter Woody Shaw in fine form... The music is reasonably accessible and swinging yet imaginative in a subtle way. Recommended".

Track listing 
All compositions by Woody Shaw except as indicated
 "There Is No Greater Love" (Isham Jones, Marty Symes) - 7:02   
 "All the Way" (Sammy Cahn, Jimmy Van Heusen) - 7:53   
 "Spiderman Blues" - 4:51   
 "The Touch of Your Lips" (Ray Noble) - 6:47   
 "What's New?" (Johnny Burke, Bob Haggart) - 7:48   
 "When Love Is New" (Cedar Walton) - 4:35

Personnel 
Woody Shaw - trumpet, flugelhorn
Cedar Walton - piano
Buster Williams - bass
Victor Jones - drums

References 

Woody Shaw albums
1984 albums
Muse Records albums
Albums produced by Michael Cuscuna
Albums recorded at Van Gelder Studio